was a 9-dan professional Go player.

Biography 
Hashimoto became a pro in 1922 when he was 15. He won the Honinbō 3 times before finally reaching 9p in 1954. He founded the Kansai Ki-in in 1950.

Titles and runners-up

References

1907 births
1994 deaths
Japanese Go players